Tomopleura dilecta, common name the beloved turrid, is a species of sea snail, a marine gastropod mollusk in the family Borsoniidae.

Description
The length of the shell attains 7 mm, its width 2.5 mm.

(Original description) The small, solid, pale yellow shell has a narrowly fusiform shape. it is tricarinate. The shoulder is sloping; The base of the shell is contracted. The siphonal canal is short and straight. The shell contains 5 whorls, of which two in the smooth, elevated protoconch. The body whorl contains three peripheral spiral keels. There are two such keels on each whorl of the teleoconch. Revolving threads occur in great numbers on the base and three or four on the shoulder. The interstices of the spirals are occupied by the broken lengths of close, fine, longitudinal, raised threads, which united described a double curve. The aperture is simple but probably underdeveloped in the specimens at hand.

Distribution
This marine species is endemic to Australia and occurs off New South Wales and South Australia

References

 Verco, J.C. 1909. Notes on South Australian marine Mollusca with descriptions of new species. Part XII. Transactions of the Royal Society of South Australia 33: 293–342
 May, W.L. 1921. A Checklist of the Mollusca of Tasmania. Hobart, Tasmania : Government Printer 114 pp.
 Hedley, C. 1922. A revision of the Australian Turridae. Records of the Australian Museum 13(6): 213–359, pls 42–56
 May, W.L. 1923. An Illustrated Index of Tasmanian Shells: with 47 plates and 1052 species. Hobart : Government Printer 100 pp.
 Allan, J.K. 1950. Australian Shells: with related animals living in the sea, in freshwater and on the land. Melbourne : Georgian House xix, 470 pp., 45 pls, 112 text figs. 
 Laseron, C. 1954. Revision of the New South Wales Turridae (Mollusca). Australian Zoological Handbook. Sydney : Royal Zoological Society of New South Wales 1–56, pls 1–12.

External links
 

dilecta
Gastropods of Australia
Gastropods described in 1903